Eloquence is fluent, forcible, elegant or persuasive speaking.

Eloquence or eloquent  may also refer to:
 Eloquence (Bill Evans album)
 Eloquence (Oscar Peterson album)
 Eloquence (Wolfgang Flür album)
 Eloquence, Internet and Wikipedia pen name of Erik Möller (born 1979), German freelance journalist, software developer and author
 Eloquent (The SWORD Project), a Bible research and study open-source application, part  of The SWORD Project

See also 
Fluency, the property of a person or of a system that delivers information quickly and with expertise.